Marion County - Rankin Fite Airport  is a public airport located one mile (2 km) south of the central business district of Hamilton, a city in Marion County, Alabama, United States. It is owned by Marion County.

Facilities and aircraft 
For the 12-month period ending August 23, 2006, the airport had 21,800 aircraft operations, 100% of which were general aviation.

References

External links 

Airports in Alabama
Buildings and structures in Marion County, Alabama
Transportation in Marion County, Alabama